John Moonlight (born July 2, 1987) is a Canadian rugby union player for the Toronto Arrows of Major League Rugby. Moonlight was formerly a Canadian Rugby 7's player on the HSBC Sevens World Series. Moonlight made his debut for Canada in 2009 in Hong Kong. He has played in 65 World Series tournaments for Canada scoring 116 tries. He has represented Canada at three Commonwealth Games and won 2 Pam-Am Games gold medals. He has also represented Canada in the rugby union 15's code. He has represented Canada 23 times and was part of the Canada squad at the 2015 Rugby World Cup.

References

External links

1987 births
Living people
Canada international rugby union players
Canadian rugby union players
Pan American Games gold medalists for Canada
Pan American Games medalists in rugby sevens
Sportspeople from Scarborough, Toronto
Rugby sevens players at the 2014 Commonwealth Games
Commonwealth Games rugby sevens players of Canada
Canada international rugby sevens players
Rugby sevens players at the 2010 Commonwealth Games
Toronto Arrows players
Rugby sevens players at the 2011 Pan American Games
Rugby sevens players at the 2015 Pan American Games
Medalists at the 2011 Pan American Games
Medalists at the 2015 Pan American Games